Neactaeonina inexpectata is a species of small sea snail, a predatory marine gastropod mollusc in the family Acteonidae, the barrel bubble snails.

Distribution
This species occurs in New Zealand.

References

 Powell A W B, William Collins Publishers Ltd, Auckland 1979 

Acteonidae
Gastropods of New Zealand
Gastropods described in 1956